Phoenix is the seventh studio album released by American punk rock band Zebrahead. Shawn Harris of The Matches created the artwork for the album, as he did with the band's previous album Broadcast to the World. Phoenix  was made available for streaming via Fuse's website on July 31, 2008, before being released on August 5, 2008 through Icon Mes. The band was due to embark on a US tour in August and September 2008,  but had to cancel it when frontman Matty Lewis started suffering from vocal issues. They ended up going on a tour of mainland Europe in October 2008.

Singles
"Mental Health" - released as the lead single from the album in June 2008. It peaked at number 16 on the Japanese charts, a music video accompanied its release.
"Hell Yeah!" - released as the second single in the fall of 2008; a music video accompanied its release.
"The Juggernauts" - released as the third and final single in winter–spring 2009; a music video accompanied its release.

The video was filmed in the summer of 2008. The video shows the band members playing at the swimming pool with a large number of visitors on holiday. At the end of the video all participants start to play a song under the water.

Track listing

Personnel
Band
Ali Tabatabaee - lead vocals
Matty Lewis - lead vocals, rhythm guitar
Greg Bergdorf - lead guitar
Ben Osmundson - bass guitar
Ed Udhus - drums

Backing staff
 Jason Freese - keyboards
 Howard Benson - keyboards on "Hell Yeah!"
 Cameron Webb - mixing, engineer
 Mike Plotnikoff - engineer
 Brian Gardner - mastering

Trivia
 "HMP" stands for Heavy Metal Push-Ups and according to the band the name came about because playing the song gave their fingers a workout.
 "Mike Dexter is a God, Mike Dexter is a Role Model, Mike Dexter is an Asshole" is a reference to the character Mike Dexter from the movie Can't Hardly Wait.

Chart positions

Release history

References

Zebrahead albums
2008 albums